In molecular biology, the ABM domain is a protein domain that is found in monooxygenases involved in the biosynthesis of several antibiotics by Streptomyces species, which can carry out oxygenation without the assistance of any of the prosthetic groups, metal ions or cofactors normally associated with activation of molecular oxygen. The structure of ActVA-Orf6 monooxygenase from Streptomyces coelicolor, which is involved in actinorhodin biosynthesis, reveals a dimeric alpha+beta barrel topology. There is also a conserved histidine that is likely to be an active site residue. In the S. coelicolor protein SCO1909 this domain occurs as a repeat.

References

Protein domains